Gobius strictus, Schmidt's goby, is a doubtfully valid species of goby native to the Mediterranean Sea where it is known from around Mallorca and Morocco and from the Adriatic coasts of Croatia. It can reach a length of  SL. It is suspected that this species actually represents a juvenile of G. cruentatus.

References

Schmidt's goby
Fish of the Adriatic Sea
Fish of the Mediterranean Sea
Fauna of Morocco
Fauna of Spain
Schmidt's goby